Álex Aizpuru Aizbitarte (born 21 January 1994), commonly known as Kaxe, is a Spanish footballer who plays for UD Ibiza. Mainly a forward, he can also play as a winger.

Club career
Born in Azpeitia, Gipuzkoa, Basque Country, Kaxe represented CD Lagun Onak as a youth, and made his senior debut with the B-team in the 2013–14 season, in the regional leagues. He subsequently started to feature for the first team in Tercera División, helping the side to achieve their best-ever campaign in 2015–16.

In July 2016, Kaxe joined SD Eibar and was assigned to the farm team also in the fourth division. In the following year, after achieving promotion, he moved to fellow league team SD Beasain, scoring on a regular basis for the latter side.

On 3 January 2018, Kaxe signed for Segunda División B side Rápido de Bouzas. On 17 July, he moved abroad and agreed to a one-year deal with East Riffa Club in Bahrain.

On 16 December 2018, Kaxe returned to his home country and signed for SD Ponferradina in the third level. He became an immediate starter, contributing with three goals in 18 appearances during the season as his side returned to Segunda División after a three-year absence.

Kaxe made his professional debut on 18 August 2019, starting in a 1–3 away loss against Cádiz CF. He scored his first goal in the second division on 1 September, netting the third in a 4–0 home routing of CD Tenerife.

On 20 November 2019, Kaxe renewed his contract with Ponfe until 2023. On 28 August 2021, he moved to Primera División RFEF side CE Sabadell FC on loan for one year.

On 16 August 2022, Kaxe signed a one-year contract with CD Atlético Baleares in the third division. The following 4 January, he returned to the second level after agreeing to a short-term deal with UD Ibiza.

References

External links
 
 
 

1994 births
Living people
People from Azpeitia
Sportspeople from Gipuzkoa
Spanish footballers
Footballers from the Basque Country (autonomous community)
Association football forwards
Segunda División players
Primera Federación players
Segunda División B players
Tercera División players
Divisiones Regionales de Fútbol players
CD Vitoria footballers
SD Beasain footballers
SD Ponferradina players
CE Sabadell FC footballers
CD Atlético Baleares footballers
UD Ibiza players
East Riffa Club players
Spanish expatriate footballers
Spanish expatriate sportspeople in Bahrain
Expatriate footballers in Bahrain